Whangaparāoa is a town on Whangaparaoa Peninsula; it is a suburban area about 25 km north of Auckland in New Zealand.

Whangaparaoa may also refer to:
Whangaparāoa, Bay of Plenty, locality in the Bay of Plenty region of New Zealand
Whangaparāoa River, in the Bay of Plenty
Whangaparaoa College, school on Whangaparaoa Peninsula